The 1989 Women's Hockey Junior World Cup was the first edition of the Women's Hockey Junior World Cup, the quadrennial women's under-21 field hockey world championship organized by the International Hockey Federation. It was held at Nepean Sportsplex in Ottawa, Canada from 19 to 30 July 1989.

West Germany won the first edition of the Junior World Cup by defeating South Korea 2–0 in the final. The Soviet Union won the bronze medal by defeating the Netherlands 4–3.

Preliminary round

Pool A

Pool B

Second round

Ninth to twelfth place classification

Fifth to eighth place classification

First to fourth place classification

Semi-finals

Third and fourth place

Final

Final standings

References

Women's Hockey Junior World Cup
Junior World Cup
International women's field hockey competitions hosted by Canada
Hockey Junior World Cup
1980s in Ottawa
Hockey Junior World Cup
Hockey World Cup
Sports competitions in Ottawa